ne0h is a Canadian hacker who received mass media attention in 1999 because of his affiliation with the hacker group globalHell, and was featured in Kevin Mitnick's book The Art of Intrusion and Tom Parker's book Cyber Adversary Characterization: Auditing the Hacker Mind.

His real identity is unknown.

References

External links
 List of gLobalHell attacks 1998–1999
 Web Archive of the first media attention toward ne0h's hacks John Vranesevich, AntiOnline September 6, 1999
 Hacker Shows Just How Easy it Really is Attrition Staff June 18, 1999
 Highlights of Kevin Mitnick's new book The Art Of Intrusion Adaptation, Profiles in Deception November 29, 2004
 Highlights of Tom Parkers book Cyber Adversary Characterization Auditing the Hacker Mind

Unidentified Canadian criminals
Canadian criminals
Computer criminals
Living people
Hacking (computer security)
Year of birth missing (living people)